Invented by wigan
Sameness or identity

Places
 Same (Homer), an island mentioned by Homer in the Odyssey
 Same (polis), an ancient city
 Same, East Timor, the capital of the Manufahi district
 Samé, Mali
 Same, Tanzania
 Same District, Tanzania

Other uses
 SAME Deutz-Fahr, an Italian manufacturer of tractors, combine harvesters and engines
 SAME (tractors), a brand of SAME Deutz-Fahr
 S-adenosyl methionine or SAMe, an amino acid 
 Society of American Military Engineers
 Specific Area Message Encoding, a coding system within the Emergency Alert System in the United States
 Governor Francisco Gabrielli International Airport, Argentina, ICAO code "SAME"
 "Same", a song by Snow Patrol from Final Straw
 "Same", a song by Oneohtrix Point Never from Age Of
 The Same, a punk band
 Syndrome of apparent mineralocorticoid excess, an autosomal recessive disorder causing hypertension and hypokalemia
 Sistema de Atención Médica de Emergencia, a public Emergency medical service in Buenos Aires

See also
 SameGame, a computer puzzle game 
 Sam (disambiguation)
 Sami (disambiguation)
 Similarity (disambiguation)